Verconia subnivalis is a species of colourful sea slug, a dorid nudibranch, a shell-less marine gastropod mollusk in the family Chromodorididae.

Distribution

Description

Ecology

References

Chromodorididae
Gastropods described in 1987